Qaravəlli (also, Qərəvəlli, Qaravəlili, Karavelli and Karavelyan) is a village and municipality in the Zardab Rayon of Azerbaijan.  It has a population of 794.

References 

Populated places in Zardab District